Roviana is a member of the North West Solomonic branch of Oceanic languages. It is spoken around Roviana and Vonavona lagoons at the north central New Georgia in the Solomon Islands. It has 10,000 first-language speakers and an additional 16,000 people mostly over 30 years old speak it as a second language (Raymond 2005). In the past, Roviana was widely used as a trade language and further used as a lingua franca, especially for church purposes in the Western Province, but now it is being replaced by the Solomon Islands Pijin. Published studies on Roviana include: Ray (1926), Waterhouse (1949) and Todd (1978) contain the syntax of Roviana.
Corston-Oliver (1996 & 2002) discuss ergativity in Roviana.
Todd (2000) and Ross (1988) discuss the clause structure in Roviana. Schuelke (2020) discusses grammatical relations and syntactic ergativity in Roviana.

Phonology and orthography

Consonants
 

The Roviana alphabet is based on the Latin alphabet and consists of the above letters.

allophones:
 ([+voiced]) / V_V →  'bathing'

 / _V [-back] →  'strong'

 is lightly trilled in unstressed syllables and strongly trilled in stressed syllables.

Vowels

V → V: / stressed Vs

V → Ṽ / _N

 / _V  →

Phonotactics

(C) V

(C represents a single consonant and V represents a monophthong or diphthong.)

Diphthongs

The majority of lexical morphemes consist of two or three syllables. Lexical morphemes consisting of four syllables or a single syllable are uncommon whereas morphemes consisting of more than four syllables have never occurred.

Stress
Stress is not contrastive.

 Roots of one syllable, with the exception of prepositions and articles;
  'go',  'come'
 Roots of two syllables are stressed on the initial syllables;
  'talk',  'taro'
 Roots of more than two syllables are stressed on the first and second syllables;
  'blood',  'cigarette'

The nominalising infix  occurs within the first syllable of the root, it always receives stress;

 'eat',  'food'

All material which precedes the root (prefixes and reduplicated material) is assigned stress as if it were a single root;

 'fight',  'chair'

The transitive suffix  takes stress;

 'hit him/her/it'

Other suffixes, however, do not take stress and are ignored in determining the placement of stress. Material following the root is not treated as a unit for the purpose of stress assignment;

 'see us (EXClusive)'

The suffix  does not receive stress.

Stress is assigned independently to each root in a compound:

 →  'church ('pray' + 'house')'

Grammar 

Roviana word order is verb–subject–object (VSO).

Pronouns

Pronominal suffixes

These are suffixed to direct/inalienable possessions such as kin terms and parts of the body.

Preposed possessor

These are suffixed to indirect or alienable possessions:

Postposed possessor

These are suffixed to a second kind of indirect or alienable possessions:

The possessive for food is prefixed  or :

The possessive for desire is prefixed o or e:

Interrogative pronouns

Indefinite pronouns

Demonstrative pronouns

Nouns

There are two classes of nouns in Roviana. The first includes kin terms, body parts and some local nouns. These are used with suffixed personal pronouns such as:

 – 'my mother' – 'her/his /its eyes'

Nouns of the second class are used with separate possessive words such as:

 – 'my book' – 'his/her/its house'

Local nouns are formed from verbs by the suffix . They denote a place where an action is performed:

 - 'sit' - 'chair'

Nouns are formed from verbs & adjectives by the infix . When the verb or adjective begins with a vowel,  is prefixed:

 - 'to walk' - 'a journey'

When the verb or adjective begins a consonant in is infixed after the first consonant:

 - 'sing' -'song'

A noun can also be formed by in from the causative or reciprocal forms of verbs:

 -'to know' - 'to show' - 'a sign'

Demonstratives

Articles in Roviana occur before the noun, marking the noun phrase as common or proper. Roviana has definite and indefinite  articles.

The indefinite article is :

 can also be exchanged with :

 and  may also be applied with plural nouns:

The definite article is :

The personal articles are the non- absolutive  and absolutive .
 is commonly used with a proper noun in the subjective case,  in the objective:

Syntax

Imperative and interrogative sentences

Imperative sentences

An actor can optionally be omitted (1); otherwise there is no structural difference from a declarative clause (2).

Interrogative sentences

Yes-no questions are structurally identical to declaratives, but have a distinct rising intonation. The two single word answers are  'yes' and  'no'.

Wh-questions or information questions contain an interrogative phrase in focus position (i.e. clause initial) and optionally is followed by the focal particle si; for example,

 'where?'
 'who?'
 'how many/much?'
 'what?'
 'how?, why?'

Interrogative morphemes are frequently preceded by the disjunctive particle na;

 'why?'
 'what?'

Complex sentences

Coordination

Coordination is marked by a conjunction between the two clauses; the conjunction belongs with the second clause;

 'but'
 'so, thus'
 'and' ( is far more common in texts)
 'or'
 'purposive'
 'then'

Subordination

Three major classes are relative clauses, complement clauses and adverbial clauses.

Relative clauses

Relative clauses follow the head N and are introduced by the invariant relative clause marker . They may only be formed on A, S and O and on the argument nominal of a verbless clause. A more detailed explanation is below.

Complement clauses

Complement clauses are introduced by the subordinator ; otherwise, they are no different from main clauses.
Complement clauses occur after verbs of cognition, speech or perception, whereas subordinate clauses (with the exception of relative clauses) occur in focus position;

Complement clauses are considered to be intermediate between main and subordinate clauses. In texts, complement clauses in Roviana are rare. Direct quotation is more frequent than subordination to higher predicates of information, while epistemic modals (e.g.  'maybe',  'EMPH) are often used rather than subordination to higher predicates of cognition (ergativity).

Adverbial clauses

Adverbial clauses occur in focus position and never contain new mentions in core argument positions. They are introduced by a subordinator and followed by the focal particle , a consequence of being in focus position;

 'after'
 'if'
 'while, when'

Subordination is extremely limited in Roviana. Subordinate clauses never contain other subordinate clauses, nor do they contain relative clauses. Similarly, relative clauses do not contain either subordinate clauses or relative clauses.

Ergativity

The subject of an intransitive verb has the same morphological marker as a direct object, and a different morphological marker from the subject of a transitive verb.

A – transitive subject, O – transitive direct object, S – intransitive subject, respectively.

Whether Roviana is an ergative language or not is argumentative, however; relative clauses in this language can be categorised by ergativity, so it can be described as an ergative language.

Relative clauses

Relative clauses in Roviana follow the head N and are introduced by an invariant relative marker . The coreferent of the N in the matrix clause is never overt within the relative clause. This feature may be according to whether the notional coreferent within the relative clause is A, S or O.

Relative clauses on A
Relative clauses on A use clausal nominalisation. The notional A has no overt realisation. The nominalised verb in a relative clause on A carries a suffix 'NSUF', which is also used to index the possessor in possessives;

When the O in the relative clause is a proper N, it is marked with the article ;

Relative clauses on S

Given that the coreferent in the relative clause does not have overt realisation;

Relative clauses on O

In relative clauses on O, A is overt in the relative clause and full verbal morphology is used to index the O. The nominal suffixes are not used in relative clauses on O;

In the context of a relative clause which is by definition subordinate, e is glossed simply ART, since it is used with proper Ns which are A or O. These following two examples have got e; the first one is on A whereas the second one is on O.

'When' clauses

'When' clauses are introduced by the subordinator  'time' or the syncopated form , but they do not specify the precise nature of the temporal relation involved;

'After' clauses

The event of an 'after' clause is introduced by the subordinator  'finish' and temporally precedes the event of the matrix clause to which it is syntactically subordinate;

'Contemporaneous' clauses

'Contemporaneous' clauses have imperfective aspect, usually accompanied by reduplication of the verb, with the meaning 'While ...-ing' or 'As ...-ing';

Conditionals

In a conditional, the protasis is a subordinate clause. As with the subordinate clauses, there is a neutral system of case marking;

External links 
 Paradisec has a number of Open Access collections that include Rovianan materials, including the Arthur Cappell collections (AC1, AC2) and Don Laycock collection (DL1).

Footnotes

References
 Corston, Simon H. (1996) Ergativity in Roviana, Solomon Islands. Canberra: Pacific Linguistics.
 Corston-Oliver, Simon H. (2002) 'Roviana.' In John Lynch, Malcolm Ross & Terry Crowley (eds.) The Oceanic languages. London: Curzon. [A lengthy sketch grammar of the language.]
 Hall, Allen.(2000). A Roviana and English dictionary/Allen and others for New Georgia, Solomon Islands. Brisbane.Jollen Press.
 Ray, Sidney H. (1926) A comparative study of the Melanesian island languages. Cambridge: Cambridge University Press. [Briefly describes a few key features of the grammar of Roviana.]
 Ross, Malcolm D. (1988) Proto Oceanic and the Austronesian languages of western Melanesia. Canberra: Pacific Linguistics. [pp240–247 discusses clause structure in Roviana.]
 Todd, Evelyn M. (1978) 'Roviana syntax.' In Stephen A. Wurm & Lois Carrington (eds.) Second International Conference on Austronesian Linguistics: Proceedings fascicle 2. Eastern Austronesian. Canberra: Pacific Linguistics. pp1035–1042.
 Todd, Evelyn M. (2000) 'Roviana clauses.' In Bill Palmer & Paul Geraghty (eds.) SICOL. Proceedings of the Second International Conference on Oceanic Linguistics: vol.2. Historical and descriptive studies. Canberra: Pacific Linguistics. pp137–154.
 Waterhouse, J.H.L. (1928) A Roviana and English dictionary. Sydney: Epworth. (Revised and enlarged 1949 by L.M. Jones and edited by Loata Parkinson in 2005).

Northwest Solomonic languages
Languages of the Solomon Islands
Languages of Papua New Guinea